Flight 158 may refer to:

 Philippine Airlines Flight 158, crashed on 12 September 1969
 Turkish Airlines Flight 158, crashed on 16 January 1983

0158